Two destroyers of the British Royal Navy have been named HMS Obedient:

 The first, launched in 1916, was an  that served in World War I, and was sold in 1921.
 The second, launched in 1942, was an O-class destroyer that served in World War II, engaging the German heavy cruiser Admiral Hipper on 31 December 1942 (Battle of the Barents Sea). She was broken up in 1962.

Royal Navy ship names